Ulf Grönholm (8 January 1943, Helsinki – 26 February 1981) was a two-time national champion rally driver, from Finland. He was killed during an illegal practice run for Hankiralli in the middle of the night on 26 February 1981 in Kirkkonummi. He was the father of eventual 2000 and 2002 World Rally Champion, Marcus Grönholm.

1943 births
1981 deaths
Sportspeople from Helsinki
Swedish-speaking Finns
Finnish rally drivers
World Rally Championship drivers
Sport deaths in Finland